Amazing Alex was a physics-based puzzle game created by Rovio Entertainment, developer of the popular strategy puzzle game Angry Birds. Amazing Alex was announced by Rovio's CEO Mikael Hed on Yle's breakfast television in May 2012. The game was based on Casey's Contraptions, a game created by Noel Llopis of Snappy Touch and Miguel Ángel Friginal of Mystery Coconut, whose rights were acquired by Rovio. 
The game featured educational elements and revolved around the character Alex, described as a curious boy with an interest in building things. The goal was to create various Rube Goldberg-esque machines in order to get a ball to a certain location. The game held similarities to The Incredible Machine, originally released in 1993.

On April 13, 2015, the game was removed from the App Store and Google Play.

Gameplay
The general premise of the game was for the player to get a ball to its goal by placing a variety of household objects to help guide the ball. Once the objects had been placed in their desired locations, the player could start the timer, after which the ball would begin to move, and the placed objects would alter their path or trajectory. The secondary aim of the game is to collect as many of the three stars placed around the level as possible. The game also included "Levels of the Week," "Downloaded Levels," and "My Levels".

Reception

Harry Slater of Pocket Gamer gave the game a Bronze Award, calling it an "addictive experience" but when "compared to Angry Birds, had less excitement involved."

References

External links
Official Website 
Official Website (archived)

2012 video games
Android (operating system) games
Educational games
IOS games
Puzzle video games
Strategy video games
Video games developed in Finland
Rovio Entertainment games
Windows Phone games